Maa Gopi is a 1954 Telugu language film directed by B. S. Ranga. The film stars V. Nagayya, G. Varalakshmi, Vallam Narasimha Rao, Jamuna.

The film was dubbed into Tamil as Jaya Gopi  and released in 1955. The film was a remake of 1953 Hindi film Bhagyawan and its Marathi version Soubhagya. Ranga also planned to dub it into Kannada and engaged his friend and popular writer Chi. Sadasivaiah to pen the dialogue. But for some reason he gave up the idea. In 1981, Sadasivaiah's lyricist-son Chi. Udayashankar suggested to Kannada matinee idol Rajkumar to remake Maa Gopi. Ranga himself directed the Kannada version, titled Bhagyavantha introducing Rajkumar's youngest son Master Lohit Puneeth Rajkumar in the title role. This too was a big hit.

Cast
The list was adapted from The Hindu article

V. Nagayya
G. Varalakshmi
Vallam Narasimha Rao
Jamuna
Relangi 
Master Venkateswarlu
Cherukumalli Raju
K. V. Subbarao
Baby Anuradha 
Master Krishnamurthy

Soundtrack
Music was composed by the duo Viswanathan–Ramamoorthy.

Telugu Songs
Lyrics were penned by Anisetty Subbarao.

Tamil Songs
Lyrics were penned by Ka. Mu. Sheriff & Kannadasan (The song book information says the dance song was penned by Ka. Mu. Sheriff while all other songs were penned by Kannadasan). Playback singers are P. Leela, Jikki, R. Balasaraswathi Devi, A. P. Komala, S. C. Krishnan & B. Nageswara Rao.

Reception
The film was a success at the box office.

References

External links

 - Jaya Gopi (Tamil version)

1950s Telugu-language films
1955 films
Indian drama films
Telugu remakes of Hindi films
Films scored by Viswanathan–Ramamoorthy